The Selling Building, also known as the Oregon National Building, is a building located in downtown Portland, Oregon, listed on the National Register of Historic Places.  It was built in 1910 for Ben Selling & Associates, composed of Ben Selling and partners Charles Moore and Moses Blum.

In 1967, when the Oregon National Life Company became a new, major tenant, the Selling Building was renamed the Oregon National Building.

See also
 National Register of Historic Places listings in Southwest Portland, Oregon

References

External links
 

1910 establishments in Oregon
Buildings and structures completed in 1910
Chicago school architecture in Oregon
National Register of Historic Places in Portland, Oregon
A. E. Doyle buildings
Southwest Portland, Oregon
Portland Historic Landmarks